The Pământ Alb is a right tributary of the river Apa Mare in Romania. It discharges into the Apa Mare in Biled.

References

Rivers of Romania
Rivers of Timiș County